Ralph Davies Munro (born June 25, 1943) is a retired American Republican politician who previously served as the 13th Secretary of State of Washington.  First elected in 1980, he served five terms.  Munro was born in 1943 in Seattle, Washington, and grew up on Bainbridge Island.  He is a graduate of Western Washington University holding a B.A. in Education and Political Science.  Munro's first job with the state was as a supply clerk working in the basement of the capitol building.  Governor Daniel J. Evans appointed Munro as the state's first volunteer coordinator in 1969.  He currently resides on Triple Creek Farm in Thurston County.

Munro was a member of the bipartisan Commission on Federal Election Reform, and strongly advocated for expanding vote-by-mail.

References 
·        The Legacy Project, Office of the Secretary of State:  "History Makers Details on Ralph Munro"

·        The Seattle Times, December 29, 2000: "Ralph Munro leaving a career carved in stone";

·        Governor's news release, September 25, 2009: "Gov. Gregoire appoints Ralph Munro to WWU board of trustees";

·        Puget Sound Business Journal, May 9, 2008: "Mud Bay archeological site has profound lessons for Ralph and Karen Munro"

·        Puget Sound Energy, press release June 3, 2008: "PSE recognizes Karen and Ralph Munro with 2008 Pioneer Award"

Ralph is currently married to Nancy Bunn, now Nancy Munro. He has thirteen grand kids who he loves dearly.

External links
 Oral History with Ralph Munro  
 The Seattle Times, December 29, 2000:"Ralph Munro     leaving a career carved in stone"
Washington's Secretaries of State - Past and Present: Ralph Munro
Ralph Munro: Disability Rights Pioneer
Clan Munro biography

Western Washington University alumni
Secretaries of State of Washington (state)
Living people
1943 births